Dyschirius addisabeba is a species of ground beetle in the subfamily Scaritinae. It was described by Bulirsch in 2006.

References

addisabeba
Beetles described in 2006